

The Flanders B.2 was a 1910s British experimental biplane designed and built by Howard Flanders and later used by the Royal Naval Air Service (RNAS)

Development
Flanders designed and built a two-seat biplane designated the Flanders B.2 to take part in military trials that were to be held on Salisbury Plain in 1912. It did not take part in the trials as an engine was not available in time. The aircraft was eventually flown with a variety of engines, with the final engine fit (a 70 hp (52 kW) Gnome rotary) the aircraft was bought in 1914 by the Admiralty and operated by the RNAS from Great Yarmouth on non-operational duties.

Operators

Royal Naval Air Service

Specifications (ABC engine as originally flown)

See also

References
 The Illustrated Encyclopedia of Aircraft (Part Work 1982–1985), 1985, Orbis Publishing

1910s British experimental aircraft
Aircraft first flown in 1912